The Society of Interventional Radiology (SIR) is an American national organization of physicians, scientists and allied health professionals dedicated to improving public health through the use of minimally invasive, image-guided therapeutic interventions for disease management.

It was founded in 1973 as the Society of Cardiovascular Radiology by an active group in the field who wanted to further develop interventional aspects of radiology. It changed its name to the Society of CardioVascular and Interventional Radiology in 1983. In April 2002, the name was changed to Society of Interventional Radiology in order to emphasise the expanding role of interventional radiology that is no longer limited to the cardiovascular system. The society comprises about 7,000 members (March 2017): including practicing physicians, trainees, scientists and clinical associates, such as physician assistants, nurse practitioners, radiologic technologists and paramedical professionals. Katharine L. Krol served as first woman president.  The Journal of Vascular and Interventional Radiology is its official journal.

See also
 Angiography
 Uterine artery embolization

References

External links
 

Radiology organizations
Medical associations based in the United States
Organizations established in 1973
1973 establishments in the United States
Medical and health organizations based in Virginia